Dairon Reyes Rueda (born 18 September 2003) is a Cuban footballer who plays as a forward for Inter Miami CF II in MLS Next Pro.

Club career

Inter Miami CF II
Reyes made his league debut for the club on 18 July 2020, coming on as a 73rd-minute substitute for Andres Cardenas in a 2-0 defeat to the Greenville Triumph.

International career
He was called up to the Cuba national team in 2021. He made his debut in a 5-0 2022 FIFA World Cup qualification win over British Virgin Islands on 2 June 2021, and scored a goal in his team's win.

References

External links
Dairon Reyes at US Soccer Development Academy

2003 births
Living people
Sportspeople from Havana
Cuban footballers
Cuba international footballers
Inter Miami CF II players
USL League One players
Association football forwards
Cuban expatriate footballers
Cuban expatriate sportspeople in the United States
Expatriate soccer players in the United States
Cuba under-20 international footballers
MLS Next Pro players